Plainfield may refer to a few places in the U.S. state of Michigan:

 Plainfield, Livingston County, Michigan
 Plainfield Township, Iosco County, Michigan
 Plainfield Township, Kent County, Michigan

Michigan township disambiguation pages